Nematoscelis is a genus of krill, containing the following species:
Nematoscelis atlantica Hansen, 1910	 
Nematoscelis difficilis Hansen, 1911
Nematoscelis gracilis Hansen, 1910
Nematoscelis lobata Hansen, 1916 
Nematoscelis megalops G. O. Sars, 1883 	 
Nematoscelis microps G. O. Sars, 1883
Nematoscelis tenella G. O. Sars, 1883

References

Krill
Crustacean genera
Taxa named by Georg Ossian Sars